Sergiy Eduardovych Stakhovsky (born January 6, 1986) is a Ukrainian former professional tennis player. Stakhovsky turned professional in 2003 and played mostly at the Challenger level from 2005 to 2008. His career-high rankings were World No. 31 in singles (September 2010) and No. 33 in doubles (June 2011).

Stakhovsky won his first career title in March 2008, as a lucky loser ranked no. 209, defeating top seed Ivan Ljubičić in the final, thus becoming the first lucky loser to win a title since Christian Miniussi in 1991. He is the elder brother of tennis player Leonard Stakhovsky. He was coached by Burghard Riehemann. He is well known for beating eight-time winner and defending champion Roger Federer in the second round of the 2013 Wimbledon Championships, ending the latter's record run of 36 consecutive major quarterfinals.

Stakhovsky retired from tennis in January 2022, and following the Russian invasion of Ukraine he joined the Ukrainian Army.

Junior career 
Stakhovsky reached career-high world rankings of No. 28 in singles and No. 32 in doubles in 2003. In 2004, he had his best junior result, losing in the final of the U.S. Open to Andy Murray, beating Donald Young in the first round. In 2002, he beat Novak Djokovic in the quarterfinals of Luxembourg, before losing to Dudi Sela in the final.

Professional career

2004 
Stakhovsky played his first ATP-level singles match in October in Moscow's Kremlin Cup. After beating Alejandro Falla in qualifying to reach the main draw, he lost to Nikolay Davydenko in the first round. He then reached the quarterfinals of a couple Challengers to finish the year ranked No. 335 in singles.

2005 
Stakhovsky began 2005 where he left off, qualifying into the ATP stop in Qatar in January and losing to Hyung-Taik Lee in the first round. In February, he won his first ATP-level singles match, qualifying into the main draw, where he beat #100 Christophe Rochus and #29 Mario Ančić before losing to #37 Robin Söderling in the quarterfinals. He spent most of the rest of the year having moderate success at the Challenger level, but did qualify once more into an ATP tournament in Russia in October, reaching the 2nd round.
He finished the year ranked #173 in singles.

In doubles, he won two Challenger tournaments, in Spain in July and Prague in November.

2006 
Stakhovsky had a rough start to the year, losing in the first round of qualifying at three straight ATP stops. By May, his ranking had slipped back to #260 before he began making progress again on the Challenger circuit. Semifinal results at major Challengers in Spain and Istanbul in July got his ranking back to #181.

In October, he qualified into ATP main draws two weeks in a row, losing in the first round to #26 Richard Gasquet in France and beating #21 Dmitry Tursunov in the first round in Moscow before losing to #54 Arnaud Clément. That brought his singles ranking to a career high of #158.

Although he did win his 4th career doubles Challenger title in Ukraine in November, he had no further singles success and finished the year ranked #198 in singles.

2007 
Stakhovsky was not as successful in 2007 in singles. He qualified twice into ATP main draws in January and February, but lost in the first round. He had more success in doubles, winning two more Challenger titles to get to a career high doubles ranking of #128 in August. But by October, his singles ranking had slipped to #294 before he began making progress on the Challenger circuit again. He reached his first Challenger singles final in a major tournament in Malaysia in his final tournament of 2007 to finish the year ranked #199 in singles.

2008: First ATP title 
Stakhovsky began 2008 by failing to qualify into several ATP and Challenger tournaments, before qualifying and reaching the quarterfinals of a major Challenger in Poland in February, losing to #68 Simone Bolelli. He then entered the qualifications of the Zagreb tournament, losing in the final round to Slovenian Blaž Kavčič, but due to Michaël Llodra's withdrawal, he entered the main draw as a lucky loser. He went on to win the tournament, defeating top players along the way, including #2 seed Ivo Karlović in the first round, #8 seed Janko Tipsarević in the quarterfinals, Simone Bolelli in the semifinals, and #1 seed Ivan Ljubičić in the final.

2009: Second ATP title 

This year has seen Stakhovsky match it with the best in a number of ATP World Tour events. In the season opener in Doha, Stakhovsky lost in the quarter-finals to #3 seed Andy Murray. In Zagreb, as defending champion, he once again made the quarter-finals, losing to Viktor Troicki. Stakhovsky played Andy Murray once more in the first round of the Barclays Dubai Tennis Championships and after being one set up and with a break in the second, he twisted his ankle whilst trying to volley. Unable to finish the match, Stakhovsky retired hurt.

As the leading player in the Ukrainian Davis Cup team, Stakhovsky defeated Chris Eaton on the opening day of the Europe/Africa Zone Playoff versus Great Britain in Scotland and partnered Sergei Bubka Jr. in closing out the tie by winning the doubles in five sets.

Stakhovsky won his maiden Grand Slam Singles and Doubles matches at Roland Garros. Stakhovsky qualified for the main draw with impressive performances in his three qualifying matches, coming from 1–4 down in the third set versus Rik de Voest to record an 8–6 victory. Playing Brian Dabul of Argentina in the first round of the Main Draw, Stakhovsky recorded a four set victory and set up a meeting with Novak Djokovic, the 4th seed. In a match lasting two days due to poor light, Stakhovsky was comprehensively defeated by the 2007 and 2008 semi-finalist in three sets. Partnering James Cerretani in the doubles, the pair won their first round match before eventually losing to the eventual champions; Lukáš Dlouhý and Leander Paes.

Stakhovsky won his second ATP title in St. Petersburg after winning epic matches against former world number 1, two time Grand Slam champion and twice former St. Petersburg Open champion, Marat Safin (who was playing his last St. Petersburg Open) and he narrowly defeated Horacio Zeballos in the final.

2010: Top 40 
Stakhovsky continued his good form in Davis Cup play with two victories in Ukraine's tie against Latvia in the 1st round Europe/Africa Zone 1 tie. He also won his third career title, beating Janko Tipsarević in the final of the UNICEF Open – a tournament Stakhovsky did not receive a seeding for. At New Haven, he won his fourth career title with highlight wins over Tommy Robredo and Marcos Baghdatis, becoming the first Ukrainian to win two titles in a season since Andrei Medvedev in 1994.

At the 2010 US Open, after knocking out Australian Peter Luczak in the first round, Stakhovsky battled into the third round with a five-set win over American qualifier Ryan Harrison, coming back from triple match point down in a fifth-set tiebreaker to win a match marked by dramatic serve-and-volleying, rallies at net, and leaping overheads from both players. In the 3rd Round, Sergiy retired in the second set trailing Feliciano López with an infected toe.

Sergiy reached a career high ranking of no. 31 on 27 September 2010. He ended the 2010 season ranked no. 46 and will begin 2011 at the Qatar Open in Doha.

2011: French Open seeding and third round

He was the 31st seed (only time he has been seeded in a grand slam) in the 2011 French Open, he faced David Guez who he beat in 4 sets he then beat future US Open finalist Kei Nishikori however his run was stopped when he faced David Ferrer where he lost in straight sets.

2012: First Olympics 
Stakhovsky represented Ukraine at the 2012 Summer Olympics, losing in the first round of the men's singles to Lleyton Hewitt.

2013: First top-10 win over Roger Federer and Wimbledon third round

He got his first top-10 win when he defeated seven-time winner and defending champion Roger Federer at Wimbledon in four sets in the second round, 6–7 (5), 7–6 (5), 7–5, 7–6 (5) to give Federer his earliest Grand Slam defeat since the 2003 French Open. This ended Federer's run of 36 consecutive Grand Slams where he had reached at least the quarterfinals. Stakhovsky was ranked 116 at the time, and Federer was ranked 3. Stakhovsky subsequently lost to Jürgen Melzer in the third round, going down in four sets.

2022: Retirement  

After his first round qualifying loss to J. J. Wolf at the Australian Open, Stakhovsky announced his retirement from professional tennis after 19 years.

Return to Ukraine
During the 2022 Russian invasion of Ukraine, Stakhovsky returned to Ukraine on 27 February to help defend the country, joining the Ukrainian Army. At the beginning of the war Stakhovsky joined a unit of the special forces of Ukraine. In February 2023 he took part in the Battle of Bakhmut.

In Ukraine, Stakhovsky was interviewed by Australian journalist Sarah Ferguson for Four Corners. Armed and in uniform, he explained that he was fighting to protect his two young sons who lived in Hungary only  from the border of Ukraine. He believes that if (Russian President) Putin is not stopped in Ukraine, that he would continue further into Europe.

Personal life
Stakhovsky is married to Russian beauty coach Anfisa Bulgakova, has three children and has lived in Budapest in Hungary since 2014. Since 2018, he has been a winemaker with his own growing area in the region of Carpathian Ukraine in the west of the country in the border area with Hungary, Slovakia and Romania.

Performance timelines

Singles

Current through the 2022 Australian Open.

Doubles

ATP career finals

Singles: 4 (4 titles)

Doubles: 4 (4 titles)

Records
 These records were attained in the Open Era of tennis.

ATP Challenger and ITF Futures finals

Singles: 16 (7–9)

Doubles: 36 (19–17)

Top 10 wins per season
He has a  record against players who were, at the time the match was played, ranked in the top 10.

References

External links 
 
 
 
 
 
 Sergiy Stakhovsky at the Ukrainian Tennis Portal
 Sergiy Stakhovsky pictures gallery
 Stakhovsky Recent Match Results
 Stakhovsky World Ranking History

1986 births
Living people
Ukrainian male tennis players
Sportspeople from Kyiv
Tennis players at the 2012 Summer Olympics
Olympic tennis players of Ukraine
Ukrainian expatriate sportspeople in Hungary
Ukrainian military personnel of the 2022 Russian invasion of Ukraine
Military personnel from Kyiv